Navas de Oro is a municipality located in the province of Segovia, Castile and León, Spain. According to the 2014 census (INE), the municipality has a population of 1,402 inhabitants.

References

Municipalities in the Province of Segovia